Natasha is a name of Slavic origin. The Slavic name is the diminutive form of Natalia.

Notable people
 Natasha, the subject of Natasha's Story, a 1994 nonfiction book
 Natasha Aguilar (1970–2016), Costa Rican swimmer
 Natasha Allegri (born 1986), American creator, writer, storyboard revisionist, and cartoonist
 Natascha Artin Brunswick (1909–2003), German-American mathematician and photographer
 Natasha Arthy (born 1969), Danish screenwriter, film director and producer
 Natascha Badmann (born 1966), Swiss triathlete
 Natasha Badhwar (born 1971), Indian author
 Natasha Barrett (disambiguation), several people
 Natasha Beaumont (born 1974), Malaysian-Australian actress
 Natasha Bedingfield (born 1981), British singer
 Natascha Bessez (born 1986), American singer
 Natasha Bowen, Nigerian Welsh writer
 Natasha J. Caplen, British-American geneticist
 Natasha Chmyreva (born 1958), Russian tennis player
 Natasha Chokljat (born 1979), Australian netball player
 Natasha Coates (born c. 1995), British disabled gymnast
 Natasha Collins (1976–2008), British actress and model
 Natasha Cornett (born 1979), American murderer sentenced to life imprisonment for the Lillelid murders
 Natasha Demkina (born 1987), Russian woman who claimed to possess paranormal vision
 Natasha Desborough (born 1974), English radio presenter
 Natasha Doshi (born 1993), Indian film actress
 Natasha Dowie (born 1988), English football player
 Natasha Eloi, English-Canadian television personality and videographer
 Natasha England (born 1952), Scottish singer, sometimes credited mononymously as Natasha
 Natasha Falle (born 1973), Canadian human rights activist
 Natasha Fatah, Canadian journalist
 Natasha Flyer (born 1969), American earth scientist and applied mathematician
 Natasha Gajewski, American chief executive officer
 Natasha Gregson Wagner (born 1970), American actress
 Natascha Hagen, Austrian singer-songwriter
 Natasha Hamilton (born 1982), British singer
 Natasha Bekvalac (born 1980), Serbian singer
 Natasha Henstridge (born 1974), Canadian actress
 Natascha Janakieva (born 1951), Bulgarian canoer
 Natasha Joubert (born 1997), South African Beauty Queen 
 Natasha Kaiser (born 1967), American athlete
 Natascha Kampusch (born 1988),  Austrian author who was abducted as a child
 Natasha Kaplinsky (born 1972), British news presenter
 Natascha Keller (born 1977), German  field hockey player
 Natasha Khan (born 1979), British singer, known under her stage name Bat for Lashes
 Natasha Khan (Pakistani singer) (born 1984), Pakistani singer-songwriter, and qualified audio engineer
 Natasha Klauss (born 1975), Colombian actress
 Natasha Kuchiki (born 1976), American figure skater
 Natasha Law (born 1970), English artist
 Natasha Leggero (born 1974), American stand-up comic and actor
 Tasha Low (born 1993), Singaporean singer and actress, otherwise known as Natasha Low
 Natasha Little (born 1969), British actress
 Natasha Lyonne (born 1979), American actress
 Natasha Mannuela Halim (born 1994), Miss World Indonesia 2016
 Natasha Marsh (born 1975), Welsh opera singer
 Natascha McElhone (born 1969), British actress
 Natascha McNamara (born 1935), Australian academic, activist, and researcher
 Natasha Ngan, British author 
 Natasha Melnick (born 1984), American actress
 Na Ying (born 1967), Chinese vocalist, otherwise known as Natasha Na
 Natasha Negovanlis (born 1990), Canadian actress and singer
 Natasha Nic Gairbheith (born 1981), Irish beauty pageant winner
 Natasha Obama (born 2001), second daughter of Barack Obama, 44th President of the United States
 Natasha Poly (born 1985), Russian model
 Natasha Poonawalla (born 1981), Indian businesswoman
 Natasha Pyne (born 1946), British actress
 Natasha Rastogi (born 1962), Indian film actress
 Natasha Reid (born 1981), birth name of American-South Korean singer Yoon Mi-rae
 Natasha Richardson (1963–2009), English actress
 Natasha Shneider (1956–2008), Russian musician
 Natasha St-Pier (born 1981), Canadian singer
 Natasha Stillwell, Scottish-Canadian television host and producer
 Natasha Stott Despoja (born 1969), Australian politician
 Natasha Suri (born 1989), Indian model
 Natasha Tang (born 1992), Hong Kong distance swimmer
 Natasha Thahane (born 1995), South African actress and model
 Natasha Trethewey (born 1966), US poet laureate 
 Natasha Vlassenko (born 1956), Russian-Australian pianist
 Natasha Watley (born 1981), American softball player
 Natasha Wightman (born 1973), British actress
 Natasha Ninković (born 1972), Serbian actress
 Natasha Zvereva (born 1971), Belarusian tennis player

Fictional characters
 Natasha, a baby Muppet in the PBS children's television series Sesame Street
 Commander Natasha, a character in Raj Comics
 Natasha Andersen, a character in the British soap opera Hollyoaks
 Natasha Blakeman, a character in  the ITV soap opera Coronation Street
 Alexis Davis (General Hospital) (born Natasha Cassadine), a character in the ABC soap opera General Hospital
 Natasha Fatale, a character in the 1960s animated television series The Adventures of Rocky and Bullwinkle and Friends
 Natasha Romanova, also known as Black Widow, a character from Marvel Comics
 Natasha Rostova, a character in the novel War and Peace by Leo Tolstoy
 Tasha Yar, a character in the sci-fi television series Star Trek: The Next Generation
 Tasha, an anthropomorphic hippo character in the Nick Jr. animated preschool television series The Backyardigans
 Tasha, a Greyhawk wizard in the roleplaying game Dungeons & Dragons

Notable animals
 Natasha (monkey), a macaque at the Safary Park zoo near Tel Aviv, Israel

Astronomy 
 Natasha is the official name of star HD 85390.

See also
 Natacha (given name)
 Nataša, given name

Russian feminine given names
Slavic feminine given names
Ukrainian feminine given names
Bulgarian feminine given names
Circassian feminine given names
Czech feminine given names
Slovak feminine given names
Serbian feminine given names
Slovene feminine given names
Croatian feminine given names
Macedonian feminine given names
Romanian feminine given names
Arabic feminine given names